Spikes is the surname of:

 Brandon Spikes (born 1987), American National Football League (NFL) linebacker
 Cameron Spikes (born 1976), American former NFL football guard
 Charlie Spikes (born 1951), Major League Baseball player
 Irving Spikes (born 1970), American former NFL running back
 Jack Spikes (born 1937), former American collegiate and American Football League running back and placekicker
 John Spikes (1881–1955), American jazz musician and entrepreneur
 Ken Spikes (1935-2009), former NASCAR Cup Series driver
 Reb Spikes (1888–1982), American jazz saxophonist and entrepreneur
 Richard Spikes (1884–1962), African-American engineer
 Takeo Spikes (born 1976), American NFL linebacker

See also
 Spike (surname)